The Schweizerisches Militärmuseum Full is the Swiss military museum, located in Full-Reuenthal, canton Aargau.

Collection 
The museum displays military hardware and uniforms of Swiss and foreign armed forces, mainly from World War II and the Cold War. The museum displays mainly tanks, artillery, anti-aircraft and anti-tank guns of the Swiss Army and other armies from the 20th century in several former factory halls.

A special feature is the complete factory collection of the former arms manufacturer Oerlikon-Bührle on the upper floor of the museum. This mainly comprises anti-aircraft and aircraft weapons. The museum also owns a German V1 flying bomb, a Reichenberg device, and engines and defence stands from English and American bombers that crashed or made emergency landings in Switzerland.

List with some of the exhibits

Swiss Army

Alouette III
De Havilland Vampire DH.100
AMX-13
Panzer 61
Panzer 68
Zielfahrzeug 68
Entpannungspanzer 65
Brückenpanzer 68
Tank gun 68
Saurer D 330 N
Saurer 2DM
Saurer 2 CM
Saurer M6
Saurer MH4
Berna 2VM
M548
M113
M109 howitzer
Panzer 38(t)
Centurion tank
Rotinoff Super Atlantic
Bucher FS 10 Flugzeugschlepper 78

Non Swiss Army Vehicles

FBW 80-N
Trabant
Goliath tracked mine
T-34
T-55
T-72
V-1 flying bomb
Fieseler Fi 103R Reichenberg
Tiger II (under reconstruction)
Panhard EBR
P-18 radar
Ural-4320
2S1 Gvozdika
Schützenpanzer Lang HS.30
MDK-2M
GAZ-69
Leopard 1
PSzH
Sturmgeschütz III

Air Defense

SNORA and SURA-D rockets
Bristol Bloodhound
Super Fledermaus
Oerlikon 35 mm twin cannon
Oerlikon 20 mm cannon
Mosquito (missile)
RSD 58

Former Mowag Factory Museum

Mowag 4x4 armored reconnaissance vehicle (armored dummy)
Mowag MR 8 
Mowag Roland
Mowag Puma 
Mowag Shark 
Mowag Spy
Mowag Tornado infantry fighting vehicle
Mowag Trojan infantry fighting vehicle
Mowag Pirat 
Mowag 3M1 Pirat 
Jagdpanzer MOWAG Cheetah 
Mowag Piranha
Mowag Eagle
MOWAG-AEG
Mowag T1 4x4

External links

 Official Website 

Military and war museums in Switzerland
Museums in Aargau
Military history of Switzerland
Tank museums
Armories (military)
Military equipment of Switzerland
Aargau